The Ivors Academy (formerly the British Academy of Songwriters, Composers, and Authors – BASCA) is one of the largest professional associations for music writers in Europe. The academy exists to support, protect, and campaign for the interests of songwriters, lyricists, and composers. It represents music writers of all genres and has approximately 2000 members.

History
The Composers Guild of Great Britain was founded in 1944 to represent classical music composers, with Ralph Vaughan Williams elected as its first president. The Songwriters' Guild of Great Britain, later known as The British Academy of Songwriters, Composers and Authors was founded in 1947 by Ivor Novello, Sir Alan Herbert, Eric Coates, Haydn Wood, Richard Addinsell, among others for the encouragement and protection of British popular music, with Eric Maschwitz acting as the first Vice Chair, and Chairman in 1948, and again between 1954 and 1958. The Association of Professional Composers was founded in 1976 by George Fenton to represent composers of film and TV music. In 1958 the Composers' Guild of Great Britain began publishing the journal Composer, and also published a number of catalogues of available works. In 1967 the organisation, under the direction of Ruth Gipps, established the British Music Information Centre.

In 1999, The Association of Professional Composers (APC) and the Composers' Guild of Great Britain (CGGB) merged with the British Academy of Songwriters, Composers, and Authors to provide a single, more powerful amalgamated organisation to represent its membership. The organization's current name was adopted in March 2009. Sir Tim Rice was elected first president, and Guy Fletcher and David Stoll served as joint chairs of a nine-member Board of Directors. Three executive committees were established to administer Pop and Theatrical Music, Concert Music, and Media. BASCA then had four genre committees representing Songwriters, Classical, Jazz, and Media composers. BASCA became known as The Ivors Academy on 25 March 2019. The organisation then moved in 2021 to a structure with a "senate" consisting of 40 songwriters and composers with committees relating to multiple genres and geographic regions.

Members of The Ivors Academy include emerging songwriters and the United Kingdom's "most experienced and successful writers". A partial list of the past and present members includes David Arnold (fellow), Harrison Birtwistle, Peter Maxwell Davies (fellow), George Fenton, Guy Garvey, Howard Goodall, Diedrich Hartmann, Annie Lennox (fellow), Elton John (fellow), and Paul McCartney (fellow). Rolling Stones members Mick Jagger, and Keith Richards are members, as are Sting, Pete Townshend, Imogen Heap, David Gilmour, George Michael, Alex Turner, Chris Martin, Lynsey de Paul, Cathy Dennis, Kate Bush, Mika, Evelyn Glennie, Gary Barlow, Chrissie Hynde, Sharleen Spiteri, and Thom Yorke.

The Ivors Academy is a member of UK Music, an umbrella organisation that represents the collective interests of the production side of the UK's commercial music industry: artists, musicians, songwriters, composers, record labels, artist managers, music publishers, studio producers, and music collecting societies.

In July 2016, songwriter Crispin Hunt became the chairman of the academy. Hunt was replaced by songwriter and composer Tom Gray (British musician) as the chair of The Ivors Academy in February 2022.  In the autumn of 2022, The Ivors Academy sponsored the 2021 Songwriters' Review in collaboration with music rights organisation Blokur. Singer-songwriter Olivia Rodrigo was announced as that year's leading songwriter.

Awards

 

In 1955, The Songwriters' Guild of Great Britain established the Ivor Novello Awards to honour excellence in British music writing. The award is considered to be "prestigious". In 1974, the Academy established the Gold Badge Awards for individuals who make outstanding contributions to Britain's music and entertainment industry, sponsored annually by PRS for Music. The organization also presents the British Composer Awards for excellence in classical and jazz music, also sponsored by the PRS for Music and in association with BBC Radio 3.

The Beatles have won 15 Ivor Novello Awards from the British Academy of Songwriters, Composers, and Authors as well as seven Grammy Awards. See also the List of awards and nominations received by The Beatles.

BASCA established the fellowship in 1999, and it was first awarded in 2000. Fellows are:
 2000 – Paul McCartney
 2001 – Malcolm Arnold, John Barry
 2005 – John Adams, David Arnold, Pierre Boulez, John Dankworth, Peter Maxwell Davies, Elton John 
 2006 – Barry Gibb, Maurice Gibb, Robin Gibb
 2007 – George Fenton
 2008 – David Ferguson
 2009 – Don Black
 2012 – Andrew Lloyd Webber
 2013 – Tim Rice
 2015 – Annie Lennox
 2020 – Kate Bush

Other services

BASCA exists to support and protect the professional interests of songwriters, lyricists, and composers of all genres of music and to celebrate and encourage excellence in British music writing.

Its aims and objectives are:
To campaign as a leading force in the domestic and international political arenas
To celebrate excellence through world-class awards ceremonies – the Ivor Novello Awards, the British Composer Awards, and the Gold Badge Awards
To inform our members in a constantly changing environment through our publications, websites, and seminars
To foster a sense of community among British songwriters, composers, and lyricists
To encourage the next generation of professional music writers.

The organization provides pro bono legal services, insurance cover, model contracts, a tax helpline, professional development seminars and master classes, online promotion, a collaboration service, networking opportunities, publications, and newsletters.

Central to BASCA's campaigning agenda currently is the digital royalties campaign: The Day The Music Died. Through this vehicle, the organisation advocates for a fairer environment for songwriters and composers by addressing the major problem areas threatening the value and security of creators’ rights.

The campaign is calling for:

 A 50/50 split in gross royalty income for writers from digital services (as in broadcasting).
 A higher proportion of advertising income.
 The removal of auto predictive fill in of illegal content with internet search engines (e.g.: Google searches and alerts).
 The removal of safe harbour for active content platforms such as YouTube.
 More transparency around non-disclosure agreements for writers so they clearly understand how and what they are being paid.

In 2015, BASCA, the Musician's Union and UK Music won an important copyright Judicial Review in the High Court. Through this procedure, they challenged the Government's decision to introduce a private copying exception into UK copyright law without providing fair compensation to rights to rights holders (as required by EU law).

Throughout the BBC's charter renewal process, BASCA focussed on speaking out about protecting the BBC (and its music services) from cuts. It made three formal submissions to government on the BBC including the DCMS public consultation. Many of BASCA's members publicly supported UK Music's #letitbeeb campaign, led by BASCA Fellow Sir Paul McCartney and gathered more than 10K signatures.

BASCA has also responded to many European Commission's consultations over the past few years including an investigation into the "Regulatory Environment for Platforms, Online Intermediaries, Data and Cloud Computing and the Collaborative Economy". It remains a vital part of ECSA the European Composer and Songwriter Alliance.

BASCA was also involved in the process to select the United Kingdom's entry in the Eurovision Song Contest.

References

Further reading

External links

Ivor Novello Awards
Gold Badge Awards
British Composer Awards

1944 establishments in the United Kingdom
Music licensing organizations
Music organisations based in the United Kingdom
Non-profit organisations based in London